Michael Lahnsteiner (born 6 December 1983) is an Austrian badminton player. He competed for Austria at the 2012 Summer Olympics.

References

Austrian male badminton players
Olympic badminton players of Austria
Badminton players at the 2012 Summer Olympics
1983 births
Living people